Rotron Power Limited is a British aircraft engine manufacturer based in Semley, Wiltshire. The company specializes in the design and manufacture of Wankel engines for unmanned aerial vehicles, light aircraft and helicopters.

The company was founded in 2008 by Gilo Cardozo, who designed the company's first Wankel engine to power a paramotor flight over Mount Everest on 14 May 2007.

The company's RT300 is a Wankel single-rotor design that produces , while the twin-rotor RT600 produces .

Products 
Summary of aircraft engines built by Rotron Power:

Rotron RT300
Rotron RT600

References

External links

Aircraft engine manufacturers of the United Kingdom
Manufacturing companies established in 2008
2008 establishments in the United Kingdom
Companies based in Wiltshire